Joseph Paul Radinovich (born April 7, 1986) is an American politician and former member of the Minnesota House of Representatives. As a member of the Minnesota Democratic–Farmer–Labor Party (DFL), he represented District 10B in north-central Minnesota. He was the DFL candidate for the United States House of Representatives in Minnesota's 8th congressional district in the November 2018 general election, losing to Republican Pete Stauber.

Early life
Radinovich was born and raised in Crosby, Minnesota. In eighth grade, the Crosby-Ironton School District which he attended proposed a large budget cut, leading Radinovich to attend a school board meeting and to participate in a student walkout.

Radinovich attended Crosby-Ironton High School, where he competed in cross country and track and field. While he was in high school, one of his close relatives attempted suicide, leading Radinovich to miss most of his junior year in order to be in the intensive care unit with his family. In February 2004, Radinovich's mother was killed by his step-grandfather, who then killed himself.

He attended Macalester College from 2004 to 2007. In 2005, when the teachers in Crosby-Ironton went on strike, he returned to his hometown to walk picket lines with faculty members.

In 2018, Radinovich became engaged to former State Representative Carly Melin.

Minnesota House of Representatives
Radinovich was elected to the Minnesota House of Representatives in 2012, defeating Dale Lueck 50.7% to 49.3%. Before winning the general election, Radinovich defeated David Schaff in the primary. Schaff criticized the then-25-year-old Radinovich for being "extremely young."

Soon after his election, Radinovich faced a difficult situation over his position on legally recognizing same-sex marriages, after his district voted for Minnesota Amendment 1 by a large margin. A series of suicides by gay students in the Anoka school district in 2011 convinced him that same-sex marriage should be legal. The students' deaths were especially compelling for Radinovich due to his own family's experience with depression and suicide. Radinovich's voting to legalize gay marriage proved controversial for both the public and his House colleagues, and he was defeated by Dale Lueck in his 2014 House re-election bid, 48% to 52%.

Campaign work
In 2017, Radinovich managed Jacob Frey's successful campaign for Minneapolis mayor, then became the chief of staff for Frey's administration. In 2021, Radinovich managed Frey's mayoral re-election campaign, winning 56% to 44%. In 2022, he began managing the campaign for Don Samuels, who is running against incumbent Ilhan Omar in the Fifth Congressional District. Samuels lost the DFL endorsement to Omar (receiving 37% of the delegate votes to Omar's 62%) but decided to stay in the race through the August primary.

2018 U.S. House campaign

On February 15, 2018, Radinovich announced his candidacy for Minnesota's 8th congressional district, following Representative Rick Nolan's announcement he would not seek re-election. He won the Democratic primary on August 14, 2018. Radinovich was subsequently endorsed by former U.S. President Barack Obama and former Vice Presidents Walter Mondale and Joe Biden.  Radinovich's campaign was opposed by $7.1 million in negative advertisements from the Congressional Leadership Fund and America First Action Super PACs.

Radinovich faced former St. Louis County Commissioner Pete Stauber in the November 2018 midterm election, losing to Stauber by a margin of 50.7% to 45.2%.

References

External links

Rep. Joe Radinovich official Minnesota House of Representatives website
Rep. Joe Radinovich official campaign website

1986 births
21st-century American politicians
American campaign managers
Candidates in the 2018 United States elections
Living people
Macalester College alumni
Democratic Party members of the Minnesota House of Representatives
People from Crosby, Minnesota